Shotton is a surname. Notable people with the surname include:

Burt Shotton (1884–1962), American baseball player, manager, coach and scout
Caroline Shotton (born 1973), English painter
James Shotton (1824–1896), English artist
Liam Shotton (born 1987), English footballer
Malcolm Shotton (born 1957), English footballer and manager
Pete Shotton (1941–2017), English businessman and musician
Ryan Shotton (born 1988), English footballer
William Shotton (1840–1909), English cricketer